CKCK may refer to:

 CKCK-FM, a radio station (94.5 FM) licensed to serve Regina, Saskatchewan, Canada
 CKCK-DT, a television station (channel 2) licensed to serve Regina